The Brussels Stock Exchange, abbreviated to BSE, was founded in Brussels, Belgium, by decree of Napoleon in 1801. In 2002, the BSE merged with the Amsterdam, Lisbon and Paris stock exchanges into Euronext, renaming the BSE Euronext Brussels. The most well known stock market index on the BSE is the BEL20.

This area is served by the premetro (underground tram) station Bourse/Beurse on lines 3 and 4.

History

Inception and construction
Following the covering of the river Senne for health and aesthetic reasons between 1867 and 1871, a massive programme of beautification of Brussels' city centre was undertaken. Architect Léon-Pierre Suys, as part of his proposal to construct a series of grand boulevards in the river's place, designed a stock exchange building to become the centre of the rapidly expanding business sector.

The Brussels Stock Exchange building was erected from 1868 to 1873, halfway down the newly created Boulevard Anspach/Anspachlaan (then called the /), on the site of the former Butter Market, itself built over the remains of the 13th-century Récollets Franciscan convent. The building was inaugurated with a large ball in the presence of King Leopold II, his wife Queen Marie Henriette, and his brother Prince Philippe, Count of Flanders. In parallel to these works, a large square, called the Place de la Bourse/Beursplein was created in front of the building.

Renovations and fire
Over the years, the stock exchange building underwent many renovations. In the period from 1930 to 1950, it was decided to increase the usable area and the incidence of light. On that occasion, a third floor was added and the central side walls on the / and the / were opened up. The load-bearing parts of the building were also reinforced with reinforced concrete to support these renovations.

During the night from Thursday 29 to Friday 30 November 1990, a fire broke out in one of the stockbrokers' cabins on the ground floor of the building, causing a lot of damage. As a result, the stock exchange risked losing its financial activities and its reason for existence. Though the building was neatly restored, automation and acquisitions were already bringing an end to old market practices. In July 1996, all market floor activities disappeared. That year, the cash market was fully digitalised and the daily meeting of stockbrokers and traders therefore became redundant.

Mergers, relocation and future usage

In 1999, a first merger took place with CIK and BELFOX (BELgian Futures and Options Exchange). On 22 September 2000, the BSE merged again with Paris Bourse, Lisbon Stock Exchange and the stock exchanges of Amsterdam, to form Euronext, the first pan-European exchange for equities and derivatives, with common trading and clearing of all products, and was renamed Euronext Brussels. In 2015, this company moved away from the stock exchange building, which had become too large, after the lease was broken by the City of Brussels in 2012. Since then, the premises have occasionally housed temporary exhibitions. In the meantime, a competition was held about repurposing the stock exchange building. Renovations started in 2020 and it is expected to reopen in 2023 as a museum of Belgian beer. The winning design by Robbrecht & Daem, Baneton-Garrino and Popoff will provide new space for the museum. On the roof there will be a panorama bar with terrace, covered by a brass awning.

Building
It is located on the Boulevard Anspach/Anspachlaan, and is the namesake of the Place de la Bourse/Beursplein, which is, after the Grand-Place/Grote Markt, the second most important square in Brussels.

The eclectic building mixes borrowings from the neo-Renaissance and Second Empire architectural styles. It has an abundance of ornaments and sculptures, created by famous artists, including the brothers Jacques and Jean-Joseph Jacquet, the French sculptor Albert-Ernest Carrier-Belleuse and his then-assistant Auguste Rodin. Some of the best examples are the group of four allegorical figures on the facade by Guillaume de Groot, symbolising Art, Agriculture, Industry and Science, as well as the friezes by Carrier-Belleuse, in which Rodin may have contributed.

The interior pediment includes caryatids by Antoine Joseph Van Rasbourgh, symbolising Protection, Trade, Art and Victory. The two monumental allegorical lion sculptures by Jacquet on each side of the main entrance's staircase (one with its head facing up, the other curved back) represent the two symbolic stock market trends (akin to the famous "bull and bear" metaphor), as well as the Belgian Nation.

See also
 Euro.nm
 Euronext 100
 History of Brussels
 Belgium in "the long nineteenth century"

References

Notes

Bibliography

External links

 

Stock Exchange
City of Brussels
Stock Exchange
Brussels
Defunct stock exchanges
Office buildings in Belgium
Companies based in Brussels
Stock exchange buildings
Second Empire architecture
Beaux-Arts architecture
1801 establishments in France
2000 disestablishments in Belgium